Mainlander may refer to:

People group/demonym 
Mainland Chinese
Waishengren, a term used in Taiwan to refer to mainland Chinese who moved to Taiwan after 1945 and their descendants
People from Greater Vancouver, used by residents of British Columbia.
Australians who live on mainland Australia, used by residents of Tasmania.
Mainland New Zealand people
People from contiguous United States and Alaska, used by Hawaiians, Puerto Ricans, or residents of overseas U.S. territories
Canadians who are not from Newfoundland or Vancouver Island, used by residents of those islands
People from Continental Europe, used by the British
People from the mainland part of metropolitan France when referred to by Corsicans or people of Overseas France, in French as les continentaux

Person 
Philipp Mainländer